KarriereKanonen is an online community and an annual competition for unsigned Danish singers and bands.

To enter the competition musicians have to upload music to dr.dk/karrierekanonen. From the pool of entered music, 12 acts are selected by a jury to play at music festival SPOT. Following  eight bands are selected to continue in the process. All eight play at Smukfest, where three winners are announced. 
The winners get tailored coaching and training through Bandakademiet, a gig at Smukfest, and airplay on DR P3 and P6 BEAT when they're ready for it.

KarriereKanonen has resulted in a good number of successful acts through the years like The Minds of 99, Vild $mith, Magtens Korridorer, Tue West, and Rasmus Nøhr.

Main participants
(selective)
2002
Monopol
Sterling
Janne Mark
Anders Østerlund
Osman Slot
Ligusterlogik
P4
Klondyke
Ørenlyd
Popfilter
Thomas Heide
Eskild Dohn
Martin Høybye

2003
Johnny Deluxe
Karoline Hausted
Phillip
Sange I Stereo
Tilt
Tue West

2004
Rasmus Nøhr
Stuen til højre
Alias (Ronnie Junker)
Coolsville
Iben Lund
Hystereo

2005
Organiseret Riminalitet
Indenrigs
Marie Key Band
Jung/Lübbers
Sticky
Magtens Korridorer

2006
Morten Dahl
Toe Thomas Køie
Peter Max
Haven Morgan
Oberst
Claes Sønderriis

2008
Birk Storm
Firehouse featuring Lady Smita
Ida Østergaard

2009
The Olympics
Non+
The Rubberhead Banditz
Leonora

2010 
IGNUG
Hunch Bettors
Mescalin Baby

2011
Kites and Komets
Boho Dancer
The Eclectic Moniker

2012
Dance with Dirt
Kaliber
Djämes Braun

2013
The Minds of 99
Vild $mith
Amin Karami

2014
Sonja Hald
For Akia
Keep Camping

References

External links
Main KarriereKanonen page on DR P3 website
KarriereKanonen Facebook

Danish radio programmes